In algebraic topology, simplicial homology is the sequence of homology groups of a simplicial complex. It formalizes the idea of the number of holes of a given dimension in the complex. This generalizes the number of connected components (the case of dimension 0).

Simplicial homology arose as a way to study topological spaces whose building blocks are n-simplices, the n-dimensional analogs of triangles. This includes a point (0-simplex), a line segment (1-simplex), a triangle (2-simplex) and a tetrahedron (3-simplex). By definition, such a space is homeomorphic to a simplicial complex (more precisely, the geometric realization of an abstract simplicial complex). Such a homeomorphism is referred to as a triangulation of the given space. Many topological spaces of interest can be triangulated, including every smooth manifold (Cairns and Whitehead).

Simplicial homology is defined by a simple recipe for any abstract simplicial complex. It is a remarkable fact that simplicial homology only depends on the associated topological space. As a result, it gives a computable way to distinguish one space from another.

Definitions

Orientations 
A key concept in defining simplicial homology is the notion of an orientation of a simplex. Thus every simplex has exactly two orientations, and switching the order of two vertices changes an orientation to the opposite orientation. For example, choosing an orientation of a 1-simplex amounts to choosing one of the two possible directions, and choosing an orientation of a 2-simplex amounts to choosing what "counterclockwise" should mean.

Chains 
Let  be a simplicial complex. A simplicial -chain is a finite formal sum

In this definition,  we declare that each oriented simplex is equal to the negative of the simplex with the opposite orientation. For example,

To define a basis explicitly, one has to choose an orientation of each simplex. One standard way to do this is to choose an ordering of all the vertices and give each simplex the orientation corresponding to the induced ordering of its vertices.

Boundaries and cycles 
The boundary operator

is the homomorphism defined by:

where the oriented simplex 

In , elements of the subgroup

are referred to as cycles, and the subgroup

is said to consist of boundaries.

Boundaries of boundaries 

Because , where  is the second face removed, . In geometric terms, this says that the boundary of anything has no boundary. Equivalently, the abelian groups

form a chain complex.

By definition, its boundary is given by: . The boundary of the boundary is given by: .

Homology groups 

In a sense, this means that there are -dimensional holes in the complex. For example, consider the complex  obtained by gluing two triangles (with no interior) along one edge, shown in the image. The edges of each triangle can be oriented so as to form a cycle. These two cycles are by construction not boundaries (since every 2-chain is zero). This makes precise the informal idea that  has two "1-dimensional holes".

Holes can be of different dimensions. The rank of the  homology group, the number

Example

Homology groups of a triangle 
Let  be a triangle (without its interior), viewed as a simplicial complex. Thus  has three vertices, which we call , and three edges, which are 1-dimensional simplices.

  is the trivial group, since there is no simplex like  because the triangle has been supposed without its interior. So are the chain groups in other dimensions.

The boundary homomorphism :  is given by:

Indeed, all three vertices become equal in the quotient group; this expresses the fact that  is connected.

(A picture reveals that this 1-cycle goes around the triangle in one of the two possible directions.) This makes precise the idea that the triangle has one 1-dimensional hole.

Next, since by definition there are no 2-cycles,  (the trivial group). Therefore the 2nd homology group  is zero.

Homology groups of higher-dimensional simplices 
Let  be a tetrahedron (without its interior), viewed as a simplicial complex. Thus  has four 0-dimensional vertices, six 1-dimensional edges, and four 2-dimensional faces. The construction of the homology groups of a tetrahedron is described in detail here.

If the tetrahedron contains its interior, then  is trivial too.

In general, if  is a -dimensional simplex, the following holds:

 If  is considered with its interior, then  and all other homologies are trivial.

Simplicial maps

Let S and T be simplicial complexes. A simplicial map f from S to T is a function from the vertex set of S to the vertex set of T such that the image of each simplex in S (viewed as a set of vertices) is a simplex in T. A simplicial map f:  determines a homomorphism of homology groups  for each integer k. This is the homomorphism associated to a chain map from the chain complex of S to the chain complex of T. Explicitly, this chain map is given on k-chains by

if  are all distinct, and otherwise .

This construction makes simplicial homology a functor from simplicial complexes to abelian groups. This is essential to applications of the theory, including the Brouwer fixed point theorem and the topological invariance of simplicial homology.

Related homologies 
Singular homology is a related theory that is better adapted to theory rather than computation. Singular homology is defined for all topological spaces and depends only on the topology, not any triangulation; and it agrees with simplicial homology for spaces which can be triangulated. Nonetheless, because it is possible to compute the simplicial homology of a simplicial complex automatically and efficiently, simplicial homology has become important for application to real-life situations, such as image analysis, medical imaging, and data analysis in general.

Another related theory is Cellular homology.

Applications 
A standard scenario in many computer applications is a collection of points (measurements, dark pixels in a bit map, etc.) in which one wishes to find a topological feature.  Homology can serve as a qualitative tool to search for such a feature, since it is readily computable from combinatorial data such as a simplicial complex.  However, the data points have to first be triangulated, meaning one replaces the data with a simplicial complex approximation.  Computation of persistent homology involves analysis of homology at different resolutions, registering homology classes (holes) that persist as the resolution is changed.  Such features can be used to detect structures of molecules, tumors in X-rays, and cluster structures in complex data.

More generally, simplicial homology plays a central role in topological data analysis, a technique in the field of data mining.

Implementations 
 A MATLAB toolbox for computing persistent homology, Plex (Vin de Silva, Gunnar Carlsson), is available at this site. 
 Stand-alone implementations in C++ are available as part of the Perseus, Dionysus and PHAT software projects.
 For Python, there are libraries such as scikit-tda, Persim, giotto-tda and GUDHI, the latter aimed at generating topological features for machine learning. These can be found at the PyPI repository.

See also
Simplicial homotopy

References

External links
Topological methods in scientific computing
Computational homology (also cubical homology)

 
Computational topology